John Montagu, 5th Earl of Sandwich, PC (26 January 1744 – 6 June 1814), styled Viscount Hinchingbrooke until 1792, was a British peer and Tory politician.

Background and education
Montagu was the eldest son of John Montagu, 4th Earl of Sandwich, by the Honourable Dorothy Fane, third surviving daughter of Charles Fane, 1st Viscount Fane. He was educated at Eton. In 1761, at the age of 17, he joined the 3rd Regiment of Foot Guards as a Captain.

Political career
In 1765, Hinchingbrooke entered Parliament as Tory Member of Parliament (although he supported the Fox-North Coalition of 1783) for Brackley, a seat he held until 1768, and then represented Huntingdonshire from 1768 to 1792, when he succeeded his father in the earldom. He served as Vice-Chamberlain of the Household from 1771 to 1782, as Master of the Buckhounds from 1783 to 1806 and as Joint Postmaster General from 1807 to 1814. He was sworn of the Privy Council in 1771.

Family
Lord Sandwich married firstly his distant cousin Lady Elizabeth Montague-Dunk, only daughter of George Montague-Dunk, 2nd Earl of Halifax, 8 March 1766. Lady Elizabeth died in 1768 and Sandwich married Lady Mary Powlett, daughter and co-heir of Admiral Harry Powlett or Paulet, 6th and last Duke of Bolton. Lord Sandwich lived and was a rural landowner at Hinchingbrooke House today in north Cambridgeshire and held other farming interests.  His eldest child, John George Montagu, by his first wife died in 1790. Lord Sandwich died in June 1814, aged 70, and was succeeded by his eldest son by his second wife, George. William is thought to be named after his uncle, William Augustus, who died at Lisbon in 1776.

Lord Sandwich had two children by his first wife, Lady Elizabeth Montague-Dunk:
Caroline Montagu, died July 1782
John George Montagu, Viscount Hinchinbroke, born 3 April 1767, died 29 November 1790

After Lady Elizabeth's death on 1 July 1768, Lord Sandwich married Lady Mary Powlett on 25 April 1772:
George John Montagu, 6th Earl of Sandwich, born 4 February 1773, died 21 May 1818, married Lady Louisa Lowry-Corry, daughter of Armar Lowry-Corry, 1st Earl Belmore
Lady Harriet Montagu, married William Baring, 2nd Baron Ashburton
Lady Catherine Montagu, married Count Alexander Walewski, illegitimate son of Emperor Napoleon I of France
John Montagu, 7th Earl of Sandwich
Hon. Francis Charles Montagu, died unmarried
Lady Mary Montagu, born 27 February 1774, died 4 October 1824, married 7 October 1796 to John Henry Upton, 1st Viscount Templetown, son of the Clerk Comptroller to the Dowager Princess of Wales, Clotworthy Upton, 1st Baron Templetown
Henry Upton, 2nd Viscount Templetown
George Upton, 3rd Viscount Templetown, married Susan Woodford, daughter of Field Marshal Sir Alexander Woodford
Hon. Edward Upton, married Susan Maddy, daughter of Rev. John Maddy, parents of Henry Upton, 4th Viscount Templetown
Hon. Mary Upton, married John Spalding
General Hon. Arthur Upton, married Hon. Elizabeth Blake, daughter of Joseph Blake, 3rd Baron Wallscourt
Lady Henrietta Susannah Montagu, born 9 August 1777, died 19 November 1825, married 3 May 1798 to Lt. Col Sir William James of Dorset, son of Lt. Col Sir Charles Hamilton James (son of Charles Hamilton (styled Comte d'Arran in France), illegitimate son of James Hamilton, 4th Duke of Hamilton and his mistress, Lady Barbara FitzRoy) by his wife, Catherine Napier, daughter of Sir Gerrard Napier, 5th Bt.
Maria James, born 1818, died 17 August 1899, married David Erskine, 13th Earl of Buchan on 17 July 1876

Lord Sandwich also had two illegitimate children, a daughter called Harriet Montagu, who married James Grant, son of Sir Ludovic Grant of Dalvey, 6th Bt. and William Augustus Montagu who rose to the rank of Vice-Admiral in the Royal Navy.

Ancestry

Gallery

References

1744 births
1814 deaths
British MPs 1761–1768
British MPs 1768–1774
British MPs 1774–1780
British MPs 1780–1784
British MPs 1784–1790
British MPs 1790–1796
Hinchingbrooke, John Montagu, Viscount
Members of the Privy Council of Great Britain
John Montagu, 05th Earl of Sandwich
People educated at Eton College
Scots Guards officers
Hinchingbrooke, John Montagu, Viscount
United Kingdom Postmasters General
Masters of the Buckhounds
Earls of Sandwich